Maddie (Madelaine) Leech (born 4 May 2003) is an English international cyclist. She has represented England at the Commonwealth Games and won a bronze medal.

Biography
Leech rode for Huddersfield Star Wheelers before joining CAMS-Basso, she was part of winning teams in the European Junior Championship team pursuit and World Junior Championship road race. She won the silver medal in the Madison and a bronze medal in the Omnium at the 2022 British National Track Championships.

In 2022, she was selected for the 2022 Commonwealth Games in Birmingham. She competed in four events, winning a bronze medal in the women's team pursuit. She also rode in the points race, the women's individual pursuit event, finishing in 12th place and the women's road race.

Leech won her first national title at the 2023 British Cycling National Track Championships, after she won the Team Pursuit.

References

2003 births
Living people
British female cyclists
British track cyclists
Cyclists at the 2022 Commonwealth Games
Commonwealth Games bronze medallists for England
Commonwealth Games medallists in cycling
21st-century British women
Medallists at the 2022 Commonwealth Games